The SIB Swiss Institute of Bioinformatics is an academic not-for-profit foundation which federates bioinformatics activities throughout Switzerland.

The institute was established on 30 March 1998 and its mission is to provide core bioinformatics resources to the national and international life science research community in fields such as genomics, proteomics and systems biology as well as to lead and coordinate the field of bioinformatics in Switzerland. In particular, it promotes research, develops databanks and computer technologies, and is involved in teaching and service activities.

History 

The institute was originally created to provide a framework for stable long-term funding for both the Swiss-Prot database and the Swiss EMBnet node. Swiss-Prot in particular went through a major funding crisis in 1996, which led the leaders of the five research groups active in bioinformatics in Geneva and Lausanne, Ron Appel, Amos Bairoch, Philipp Bucher, Victor Jongeneel and Manuel Peitsch to create SIB. Once created, the institute could then apply for funding under a Swiss law that allows the government to fund up to 50% of expenses of vital research and teaching infrastructures. 

The first director of the institute was Victor Jongeneel followed by Ernest Feytmans between 2001 and September 2007. From 1 October 2007 until July 2018, the institute was led by Ron Appel, one of its founding members. Between July 2018 and March 2022, the SIB is led by Christine Durinx and Ron Appel, as Joint Executive Directors. Starting 1st April 2022, Christophe Dessimoz will replace Christine Durinx as joint executive director.

Organisation 

The SIB Swiss Institute of Bioinformatics is a federation of research groups with affiliated bioinformaticians at 21 SIB partner institutions, including the Universities of Basel, Bern, Fribourg, Geneva, Lausanne, Lugano and Zurich, the Federal Institutes of Technology in Lausanne and Zurich, the Friedrich Miescher Institute for Biomedical Research, the Institute of Oncology Research in Bellinzona, and the Geneva School of Business Administration (HEG). Current research groups in SIB are located in Basel, Bern, Fribourg, Geneva, Lausanne, Lugano, Zurich, Yverdon, Wädenswil, Bellinzona and Davos.

SIB federates more than 70 research, service and infrastructure groups, gathering more than 700 scientists in fields as varied as proteomics, transcriptomics, genomics, systems biology, structural bioinformatics, evolutionary bioinformatics, modelling, imaging, biophysics, population genetics and clinical bioinformatics. The SIB organizes an annual international scientific meeting, the [BC]2 Basel Computational Biology Conference.

Bioinformatics resources 

The institute offers a wide range of resources for the life science research community, most being open and accessible through Expasy, the SIB bioinformatics resource portal. They include:

Databases 

SIB develops and maintains databases of international standing, including UniProtKB/Swiss-Prot (curated protein sequence database providing a high level of annotation), neXtProt (human-centric protein knowledge platform), SWISS-MODEL Repository (three-dimensional protein structure models), STRING (protein interaction networks for Systems Biology), SwissRegulon (genome-wide transcription regulatory networks), Eukaryotic Promoter Database (EPD), SWISS-2DPAGE (2D gel database), WORLD-2DPAGE Repository (2D gel repository), PROSITE (protein families and domains), MyHits (protein sequences and motifs),  Bgee (database to retrieve and compare gene expression patterns between animal species), OpenFlu (database for human and animal influenza virus), ViralZone (portal to viral UniProtKB entries), GlycoSuiteDB (glycan database), SugarBindDB (Pathogen Sugar-Binding Database), OrthoDB (the hierarchical catalogue of eukaryotic orthologs), miROrtho (the catalogue of animal microRNA genes), ImmunoDB (insect immune-related genes and gene families) and Cellosaurus (a knowledge resource on cell lines).

Software tools 

SIB develops and supplies software for the global life science research community, such as SWISS-MODEL (protein structure homology modelling), SwissDrugDesign (computer-aided drug design),  Melanie (2D gel analysis platform), MSight (LC-MS imaging and analysis software), OMA (Orthology Matrix), V-pipe (viral genomics pipeline), DeepView/Swiss-PdbViewer (protein visualization, modelling and analysis), and Newick utilities (high-throughput phylogenetic tree processing).

Core facilities 

SIB manages several bioinformatics core facilities that provide informatics and statistical support, as well as services and advice to life scientists, thus enabling them to conduct their research projects and analyse the resulting data. Core facilities have been set up for genomics, transcriptomics and proteomics research. SIB also maintains the Vital-IT High Performance Computing Centre that provides computational resources, development support and consultancy to the Swiss life science community both in academia and industry. The Vital-IT infrastructure is distributed to three sites: University of Lausanne, EPFL and University of Geneva. Compute resources and bioinformatics expertise are also provided in the Basel area with sciCORE, the Basel Computational Biology Center.

Education and training 
One of SIB’s priorities is to promote and coordinate education in bioinformatics. SIB members are directly, or indirectly, involved in a number of bioinformatics courses at all educational levels – from high school to undergraduate and graduate degrees – as well as in specialized training for life scientists. SIB also promotes a PhD Training Network in bioinformatics, which is open to graduate students at Swiss schools of higher education. The objectives of this network are two-fold:
 To offer graduate students in bioinformatics a set of cutting-edge courses that provide both the theoretical and the practical knowledge necessary to work on a successful PhD research project in bioinformatics.
 To foster the development of a network of PhD students and promote the exchange of ideas, as well as the mobility of the students between participating institutions.

Popular science 
The SIB is also involved in bringing bioinformatics to the layman. Understanding the growing importance this relatively recent science has in today’s society is becoming fundamental. Indeed, in not too distant a future, patients will be referring to results directly generated by bioinformatics methods. Since the year 2000, in order to heighten public awareness, the SIB has taken part in numerous science fairs, created two online magazines, an outdoor exhibition and, in 2012, a virtual exhibition.

See also 
 Lausanne campus
 List of biological databases
 Science and technology in Switzerland

Notes and references

External links 
 
 Swiss Bioinformatics Resource Portal (Expasy)

Bioinformatics organizations
Research institutes in Switzerland
Organizations established in 1998